Gangrel Dam officially the Pandit Ravishankar Sagar is located in Chhattisgarh, India. It is built across the Mahanadi River. It is located in Dhamtari district, about 17 km from Dhamtari and about 90 km from Raipur. It is the longest & largest dam in Chhattisgarh. This dam supplies year round irrigation, allowing farmers to harvest two crops per year and key water supplier of Bhilai Steel Plant. The dam also supplies 10 MW of hydro-electric power capacity.

The chief Engineer of this project was Devraj.

Onakona is a popular tourist spot located on the banks of the reservoir.

References

External links
 Gangrel dam . wikimapia

Dams in Chhattisgarh
Dams on the Mahanadi River
Dhamtari district
Dams completed in 1979
1979 establishments in Madhya Pradesh
20th-century architecture in India